George Edward "Carp" Julian (February 6, 1893 – May 9, 1977) was an American football player.  He played at the fullback position at Michigan Agricultural College (MAC), now known as Michigan State University, from 1911 to 1914. He was selected by Walter Eckersall in 1913 as a first-team All-American fullback.  He also served as captain of MAC's 1914 football team.  He later played professional football for Jim Thorpe's Canton Bulldogs in 1915 and 1916, gaining 205 yards in four games.

He died on May 9, 1945, at Lansing, MI.

References

1893 births
1977 deaths
American football fullbacks
Canton Bulldogs players
Michigan State Spartans football players
Sportspeople from Rochester, New York
Players of American football from Michigan